Mostépha Ben Boulaid Airport , also known as Batna International Airport or Batna Airport, is an airport serving Batna, Algeria.

Airlines and destinations

References

External links
 Google Maps - Batna
 Batna Airport
 Etablissement de Gestion de Services Aéroportuaires d’Alger (EGSA Alger)
 
 

Airports in Algeria
Batna, Algeria
Buildings and structures in Batna Province